The Center for Civil Liberties is a Czech think tank founded by Václav Klaus Jr. in January 2017, focusing on civil liberties, economic issues, and education. Klaus said that his aim is for the institute to compete with the Václav Havel Library.

The center is associated with the Tricolour Citizens' Movement.

Activities
The Center for Civil Liberties is active in the Šumava National Park, which was devastated by bark beetles. When the Czech parliament approved a new environmental protection law, local municipalities protested because they believed it ignored the local human population. The center supported these municipalities, with Klaus stating that people are also a part of the environment. On 16 March 2017 the think-tank organised a conference about the situation in Šumava, which was attended by around 150 people.

References

Tricolour Citizens' Movement
Civic Democratic Party (Czech Republic)
Think tanks based in the Czech Republic
2017 establishments in the Czech Republic